The Monterrey Flash, is a Mexican professional indoor soccer team based in Monterrey, Nuevo León, Mexico. Founded in 2011 as part of the Liga Mexicana de Futbol Rapido Profesional (LMFRPro), the team made its debut in the Professional Arena Soccer League (PASL) with the 2013–14 season. The team plays its home games at the Arena Monterrey. 

When it entered the PASL, the Monterrey Flash became the third Mexican team to be part of the US-based league, joining the Tijuana-based Toros Mexico and Saltillo Rancho Seco. With the Toros not part of the re-branded Major Arena Soccer League, both Mexico-based teams were in the new Southern Division along with four teams based in Texas for 2014–15.

History
In 2011, Monterrey Flash placed 1st in the LMFRPro. On November 3, 2013, at the first match of the 2013–14 season, Monterrey Flash set the PASL attendance record for a match with an attendance of 9,626.

Year-by-year

Roster

Active players 
.

References

External links
Monterrey Flash official website

 
2013 establishments in Mexico
Major Arena Soccer League teams
Defunct Professional Arena Soccer League teams
Association football clubs established in 2011
Football clubs in Monterrey
Mexican indoor football teams